
Gmina Leoncin is a rural gmina (administrative district) in Nowy Dwór County, Masovian Voivodeship, in east-central Poland. Its seat is the village of Leoncin, which lies approximately 12 kilometres (7 mi) south-west of Nowy Dwór Mazowiecki and 37 km (23 mi) north-west of Warsaw.

Villages
Gmina Leoncin contains the villages and settlements of Cisowe, Gać, Głusk, Gniewniewice Folwarczne, Górki, Krubiczew, Leoncin, Mała Wieś przy Drodze, Michałów, Nowa Dąbrowa, Nowa Mała Wieś, Nowe Budy, Nowe Gniewniewice, Nowe Grochale, Nowe Polesie, Nowiny, Nowy Secymin, Nowy Wilków, Ośniki, Rybitew, Secymin Polski, Secyminek, Stanisławów, Stara Dąbrowa, Stare Gniewniewice, Stare Grochale, Stare Polesie, Teofile, Wilków nad Wisłą, Wilków Polski, Wincentówek and Zamość.

Neighbouring gminas
Gmina Leoncin is bordered by the gminas of Brochów, Czerwińsk nad Wisłą, Czosnów, Kampinos, Leszno and Zakroczym.

References

External links
Polish official population figures 2006

Leoncin
Nowy Dwór Mazowiecki County